Khar Yek (also Romanized as Khār Yek and Khārīk) is a village in Mazkureh Rural District, in the Central District of Sari County, Mazandaran Province, Iran. At the 2006 census, its population was 595, in 155 families.

References 

Populated places in Sari County